Ignacio Uriarte (born October 1, 1986, in Manhattan, New York) is a New York-based Singer-songwriter. Since 2015 he is singing under the name Lions Head

Life 

Dellacane made it into the final round of the Emergenza Music Festival at Webster Hall in New York City in 2007, and Dal Pra and Uriarte were interviewed for The New York Times.

In 2008, Uriarte contributed songs to the soundtrack of a documentary called "Single", written, produced and directed by Richard Atkinson and Jane Scandurra of Go Pictures and Films, LLC.
In 2009, Uriarte signed with an independent label called g*nius entertainment and has been recording songs for his debut album.

2013 and 2014 he released two singles with Iggy & the German Kids. Since 2015 he is part of the American/German collaboration Lions Head.

Discography 
 2015: Lions Head: Begging (Single) – Label: Tanz Dich Glücklich
 2016: Lions Head: When I Wake Up (Single) – Label: Sony Music
 2016: Lions Head: LNZHD (Album) – Label: Sony Music
 2016: Lions Head: See You (Single) – Label: Sony Music
 2017: Lions Head: True Love (Single) – Label: Sony Music
 2017: Lions Head: Golden (Single) – Label: Sony Music

References

External links
 Official Homepage

American singer-songwriters
Living people
1986 births